Starksia hassi, the ringed blenny, is a species of labrisomid blenny native to the Caribbean Sea and the Atlantic Ocean. This species can reach a length of  TL.

Starksia hassi can easily move within and below an anemone without being stung by its tentacles, and uses this property for self-defense. It normally rests within the anemone, and hides further into its tentacles when approached.

The specific name honours the Austrian biologist and underwater diving pioneer Hans Hass (1919-2013) who was the leader of the expedition on which the type of this species was collected.

References

hassi
Fish described in 1958